Hesar-e Teymur Tash (also Romanized as Ḩeşār-e Teymūr Tāsh; also known as Ma‘şūm ‘Alī, Tehmūrtāsh, and Teymūr Tāsh) is a village in Badranlu Rural District, in the Central District of Bojnord County, North Khorasan Province, Iran. At the 2006 census, its population was 168, in 48 families.

References 

Populated places in Bojnord County